Rahul Yadav (born 1989) is an Indian entrepreneur, known as the co-founder and former CEO of real estate search portal Housing.com. 

Citing his young age, he distributed all of his personal equity in Housing.com, worth around 200 crore rupees, to its 2,251 employees. His dismissal as CEO by Housing.com's board of directors attracted considerable media attention. Subsequently, Yadav announced his latest venture, Intelligent Interfaces which would assist companies and organisations in automating processes.

Early life and career
Yadav was born to middle-class parents from Khairtal, Rajasthan. He enrolled at Indian Institute of Technology Bombay in 2007, specialising in metallurgy. He served as the representative and secretary for the university's student association. After first building Exambaba.com, an online question bank of old exam papers that IIT Bombay asked Yadav to close, Rahul dropped out of college in his final year. In the process of building Exambaba.com, he had learned programming, which enabled him to subsequently design a series of Google applications. In 2012, he along with eleven other classmates co-founded Housing.com, after they had a difficult time finding accommodation in Mumbai.

Housing.com
Housing.co.in was founded in 2012, and was later renamed Housing.com. Yadav says that he started up Housing.com in response to a severe housing shortage in India. By mid-2015, under Yadav's leadership, Housing.com had three offices in Powai, a suburb of Mumbai. The site aims to increase transparency in the real estate market. Its original line-up of products include map-based rental search, verified purchase of apartments, buildings and even land in villages and rural areas and 'Slice View' which allows customers to take a virtual tour of chosen properties of big real estate companies. Having successfully solicited major investors to back the site, Yadav retained only a five per cent share in the business which later made it possible for investors to oust him.

Housing.com was named one of the hottest tech startups in 2012. SoftBank was among its funding partners, and the fledgling company also partnered with Tata Housing and Tata Value Homes. According to Forbes India, Housing.com sold eight million dollars' worth of real estate in its first week.

In June 2015, Rahul was fired by the company board citing "his behaviour towards investors, ecosystem and the media". The shares of his business that Yadav donated to his former employees was considered to be the equivalent to a year's salary. In an apparent explanation of his actions, Yadav said, "I'm just 26 and it's too early in life to get serious about money, etc," in an interview with the Financial Express.

Intelligent Interfaces 
In September 2015, Rahul announced his new venture Intelligent Interfaces. Intelligent Interfaces is reportedly a data analytics company and visualisation company catering to e-commerce companies.

References

1988 births
Living people
IIT Bombay alumni